Narbachi Wadi is a 2013 Indian Marathi language movie directed by Aditya Sarpotdar. It is an adaption of the Bengali play Shajjano Bagan by Manoj Mitra.

Plot

Set in 1946 in a village in Konkan, the movie starts off with a middle aged villager, Naroba (Dilip Prabhavalkar), watering his coconut trees in his grove with his grandson(Srujan Watve). The landlord of the village, Rangarao Khot (Manoj Joshi) is a flirtatious man and the antagonist. One day he halts his palanquin and gets off to follow a woman passing by, only to discover that she is a transsexual man. Shocked and embarrassed, he walks to a nearby coconut grove, and becomes bedazzled by its beauty; he instructs his servant to prepare the grove for a tamasha to be held that night. Naroba, had been working nearby approaches the landlord and declines giving up the grove which it was given to him by his father who had received it from the landlord's father himself for saving his father's life during a hunting trip. In a fit of rage, the landlord threatens Naroba to kill him in order to sign the contract transferring the ownership of the grove from Naroba to him. That night, as the landlord's crooks try to enter his house, he is saved by a gang of armed dacoits; their leader later recognizes Naroba to be the person who nursed him when he was sick and starving. He swears to protect him from the landlord's actions, and warns the landlord to stay away from Naroba or face humiliation in front of the entire village. Horrified and abashed, the landlord staggers to his bedroom and locks himself in. He is found dead the next morning due to alcohol overdose.

The movie jumps to twenty years later when the landlord's son, Malhar (also played by Joshi), is in charge and decides to strategically lure Naroba into a contract which will ensure that the grove will be consigned to him after Naroba's death, fulfilling his father's wishes. To make the contract seem favorable to Naroba, he promises to pay him a monthly stipend of  150 (a considerable amount of money in those days) for as long as he lives. Although Naroba's health seems fragile, he is quite healthy and lives for 6 months after signing the contract; the landlord had expected him to die in a month. As more months go by, the landlord's financial situation exasperates and he so does his health. Naroba tells him that although he wants to die, Yama won't come to him; on hearing this the landlords offers him a bottle of rat poison which Naroba drinks, hoping to die. When the landlord reaches Naroba's house the next day to take him to his funeral, he is startled to see Naroba alive, and dies of a shock. As a condition of the contract, on his death, Naroba retains the ownership of his grove.

In the epilogue set eight years later, Naroba is shown with his great-grandson, Krishna. The movie ends with Naroba telling him that greed is dangerous and that it turns you into an ogre, referring to the father and son who died trying to acquire his land by force and by tact.

Cast

 Dilip Prabhavalkar as Narba
 Manoj Joshi as Rangarao Khot / Malhari Khot
 Nikhil Ratnaparkhi as Berke
 Kishori Shahane as Renuka
 Ambarish Deshpande as Raghav Khot
 Vikas Kadam as Pandhari
 Jyoti Malshe as Kaminibala / Manju
 Kamlakar Satpute as Dadu Nhavi
 Bhalchandra Kadam as Dr. D'souza
 Atul Parchure as Dattoba Lingappa Kaikini
 Suhas Shirsat as Chor (Thief) 
 Srujan Watve as Young Pandhari

Soundtrack

Reception 

Aparna Phadke of The Times of India gave the movie a 3.5/5 rating, calling it "thoroughly enjoyable". She praised Aditya Sarpotdar for a "tight script that has just the right blend of emotions and humour".

References

2013 films
Indian drama films
2010s Marathi-language films
Films directed by Aditya Sarpotdar